Armin Moczek (born 8 July 1969 in Munich) is a German evolutionary biologist and full professor at Indiana University Bloomington.

Biography
Moczek studied biology at the University of Würzburg, where he graduated in 1996 with a master's degree in zoology. Joining Fred Nijhout’s lab at Duke University he developed a deep interest in Evolutionary developmental biology, receiving his PhD in 2002. From 2002 to 2004 he joined the University of Arizona as a postdoctoral fellow in the Postdoctoral Excellence in Research and Teaching (PERT) program. In 2004, he assumed the position of assistant professor at the Department of Biology at Indiana University, where he was promoted to associate professor in 2009 and full professor in 2014. His research focuses on the genetic, developmental, and ecological mechanisms, and the interactions among them, that facilitate innovation in living systems.

Awards
Guggenheim Fellow (2017) Indiana University Bloomington, College of Arts and Sciences, Department of Biology
Fulbright Distinguished Chair in Science, Technology, and Innovation Award (2017), Fulbright Award, Location: Australia, Indiana University Bloomington
American Association for the Advancement of Science (2015), American Association for the Advancement of Science, Indiana University Bloomington, College of Arts and Sciences
 American Society of Naturalists (ASN) Young Investigator Prize (2004)

References

External links
 Armin Moczek, Indiana University
 Moczek Lab
 Armin Moczek, local coordinator of the Extended Evolutionary Synthesis research program 
 Evolution Evolving: Armin Moczek (YouTube)
 Sir John Guggenheim Memorial Foundation: Armin P. Moczek
 The Fulbright Program
 Google Scholar citations

1969 births
Extended evolutionary synthesis
Theoretical biologists
Evolutionary biologists
Indiana University
Living people